The 2019 Tandridge District Council election  took place on 2 May 2019 to elect one third of members to Tandridge District Council in England coinciding with other local elections

Results
Tandridge District Council Election 2019 results.

Ward results
An asterisk * indicates an incumbent seeking re-election.

     
       										
				 			
     
       										
				 			
     
       										
				 			
     
       										
				 			
     
       										
				 			
     
       										
				 			
     
       										
				 			
     
        

In the previous election in 2015 Liz Lockwood won the seat for the Conservatives, before declaring as an Independent on 25 May 2017.

References

2019 English local elections
May 2019 events in the United Kingdom
2019
2010s in Surrey